The Algonquin Club of Boston, presently known as The Quin House, is a private social club in Boston, Massachusetts, founded in 1886. Originally a business-themed gentlemen's club, it is now open to men and women of all races, religions, and nationalities.

History 
The Algonquin Club of Boston was founded by a group, including General Charles Taylor. Its clubhouse on Commonwealth Avenue was designed by McKim, Mead & White and completed in 1888, and was soon called "the finest and most perfectly appointed club-house in America" and more recently the "most grandiose" of Boston's clubs. At the time of founding women, Irish Catholics, Jews and blacks were not able to join the club.

It remains the only "socially elite" old-guard Boston club with a purpose-built clubhouse. The Harvard Club, for example, built its Commonwealth Avenue clubhouse in 1912–1913. A real estate company bought the clubhouse in 2018. , the club is closed for renovations, including a new fitness facility and a roof deck. It will remain a private club, but plans to expand its membership. The Algonquin Club maintains reciprocal relationships with more than 150 social clubs worldwide.

See also
 List of gentlemen's clubs in the United States

References

External links
 Web site archive

1886 establishments in Massachusetts
Clubs and societies in Boston
McKim, Mead & White buildings
Gentlemen's clubs in the United States
Organizations established in 1886